"Las Vegas" is a 1970 song written by Mitch Murray and Peter Callander, best known in the version recorded by Tony Christie, which was his first UK hit in January 1971. It peaked at No. 21 in the UK Singles Chart.

It was also recorded by Roberto Blanco (1970), Derek Dixon, Joe Dolan (1972), and in Danish by Poul Rudi to lyrics by Sejr Volmer-Sørensen (1973).

References

1970 songs
Tony Christie songs
Songs written by Mitch Murray
Songs written by Peter Callander
Songs about Las Vegas